The Indoor Bowl was the main championship game of the National Indoor Football League (NIFL). In 2001, it was played between the top two teams who survived the eight-team playoff format. Since 2002, it has been played between the Atlantic Conference champion and the Pacific Conference champion.

Games

Indoor Bowl results

Indoor Bowl appearances
Billings Outlaws: 2 (lost 1), (won 1)
Fayetteville Guard: 2 (won 1), (lost 1)
Ohio Valley Greyhounds: 2 (won 2)
Lexington Horsemen: 1 (won 1)
Mississippi Fire Dogs: 1 (won 1)
Rome Renegades: 1 (lost 1)
Sioux Falls Storm: 1 (lost 1)
Tri-Cities Fever: 1 (won 1)
Utah Warriors: 1 (lost 1)
Wyoming Cavalry: 2 (lost 2)

External links
 Indoor Bowl I stats
 Indoow Bowl II stats
 Indoor Bowl III stats
 Indoor Bowl IV stats
 Indoor Bowl V & Playoff results 
 Indoor Bowl VI result

National Indoor Football League
Indoor American football competitions